The Women's Malaysian Open Squash Championships 2013 is the women's edition of the 2013 Malaysian Open Squash Championships, which is a tournament of the WSA World Series event Gold (Prize money : 70 000 $). The event took place in Kuala Lumpur in Malaysia from 11 to 15  September. Nicol David won her eighth Malaysian Open trophy, beating Raneem El Weleily in the final.

Prize money and ranking points
For 2013, the prize purse was $70,000. The prize money and points breakdown is as follows:

Seeds

Draw and results

See also
WSA World Series 2013
Malaysian Open Squash Championships
Men's Malaysian Open Squash Championships 2013

References

External links
WSA Malaysian Open Squash Championships website
CIMB Malaysian Open 2013 Squashsite website

Squash tournaments in Malaysia
Kuala Lumpur Open Squash Championships
2013 in Malaysian women's sport
2013 in women's squash
Women in Kuala Lumpur